Davisville is a subway station on Line 1 Yonge–University in Toronto, Ontario, Canada. It is located at 1900 Yonge Street, where it intersects with Chaplin Crescent and Davisville Avenue. The station opened in 1954 as part of the original Toronto subway. In 2002, this station became accessible with elevators.

Description
The station is on three levels: the entrances are located on street level, the concourse and collector booths are on the mezzanine (second) level, and the subway platforms are on the lower level.

There are four entrances that connect the station to two buildings in the area:
 three accessible entrances from the TTC head office
 an unstaffed entrance at 1910 Yonge Street, near Chaplin Crescent, which leads directly to the northbound subway platform

An artwork titled 100 Years with the TTC is displayed at the mezzanine level of the station; it celebrates the 100th anniversary of the TTC. Working with STEPS Public Art, an organization that develops public art installations, artist Rosena Fung designed the work using contributions by 12 school students, the winners of a contest to depict futuristic vehicles.

Subway infrastructure in the vicinity 

The station is constructed above ground, but below street level, with separate canopies over each platform. It is adjacent to the Davisville Subway Yard, which is visible from the trains and platforms. The station has a unique semi-active third platform, on the yard side - actually referred to as the Davisville Buildup - which can be used by trains entering or leaving the yard on service or as an alternate route if one of the running lines is blocked.

The line continues in open cut in both directions: north as far as the Berwick Portal, immediately before Eglinton station; and south as far as the Muir Portal, roughly halfway to St. Clair station, from which it continues in tunnel.

Nearby landmarks 

Nearby landmarks include the Mount Pleasant Cemetery, the Upper Canada College campus, and the TTC's main administrative office building, the William McBrien Building. The station's bus platforms are under the western half of the building at street level, and the open-air northbound subway platform abuts against the building's west wall.

The former Canadian National Railways Belt Line Railway railway corridor crosses over the subway tracks south of the station. It has been converted into a pedestrian and biking trail, called the Beltline Trail.

Surface connections 

TTC routes serving the station include:

References

External links 

Line 1 Yonge–University stations
Railway stations in Canada opened in 1954